Caquetá may refer to:

 Caquetá River, a river in Colombia
 Caquetá Territory, a former territory of Colombia
 Caquetá Department, a department of Colombia
The caqueta river is a river that flows through Columbia and Brazil. Though, only a small part is actually in Brazil. There, it is called the 'Japura River'.